The 2016–17 season was the 16th season in the existence of S.V. Zulte Waregem and the club's 12th consecutive season in the top flight of Belgian football. In addition to the domestic league, S.V. Zulte Waregem participated in this season's edition of the Belgian Cup.

Players

First-team squad

On loan

Pre-season and friendlies

Competitions

Overall record

First Division A

Regular season

Results summary

Results by round

Matches

Championship play-offs

Results summary

Results by round

Matches

Belgian Cup

References

S.V. Zulte Waregem seasons
Zulte Waregem